Alfredo Jacobo Rodríguez (born April 7, 1982) is an Olympic breaststroke swimmer from Mexico.

Career
Alfredo is the older brother of fellow Mexican swimmer, Alejandro Jacobo. He represented Mexico at the 2000 Olympics.

Jacobo also swam for Mexico at the 2003 and 2007 Pan American Games.

As of March 2008, he holds the Mexican Records in the long-course (50m) 50 breaststroke; and the short-course (25m) 50, 100 and 200 breaststrokes.

Alfredo, and his brother Alejandro, both competed/attended college and swam in the USA at Texas A&M University.

References

1982 births
Living people
Mexican male breaststroke swimmers
Texas A&M Aggies men's swimmers
Swimmers at the 1999 Pan American Games
Swimmers at the 2000 Summer Olympics
Swimmers at the 2003 Pan American Games
Swimmers at the 2007 Pan American Games
Olympic swimmers of Mexico
Pan American Games competitors for Mexico
Sportspeople from León, Guanajuato
Central American and Caribbean Games gold medalists for Mexico
Central American and Caribbean Games silver medalists for Mexico
Competitors at the 2006 Central American and Caribbean Games
Central American and Caribbean Games medalists in swimming
20th-century Mexican people
21st-century Mexican people